Chascanopsetta prorigera is a species of fish in the family Bothidae.

References 

Bothidae
Animals described in 1905